Lamptey is a surname of Ghanaian origin.

It may refer to:

 Nathaniel Lamptey (b. 1983), footballer
 Nii Lamptey (b. 1974), footballer
 Peter Lamptey (b. 1946), footballer
 Richmond Lamptey (b. 1997), footballer
 Tariq Lamptey (b. 2000), footballer
 Emmanuel Obetsebi-Lamptey (1902 – 1963), politician
 Jacob Otanka Obetsebi-Lamptey (b. 1946), politician
The name is given among the Ga tribe in the Greater Accra region of Ghana.

Surnames